Mark Assibey-Yeboah (March 2, 1974) is a Ghanaian politician and member of the Sixth and Seventh Parliaments of the Fourth Republic of Ghana, representing the New Juaben South Constituency in the Eastern Region on the ticket of the New Patriotic Party (NPP).

He served as a member of the Finance and Youth and Sports Committees of the Sixth Parliament and as Chairman of the Finance Committee for the Seventh Parliament of the Fourth Republic of Ghana.

Personal life 
Assibey-Yeboah is a Christian. He is married with three children.

Early life and education 
Mark Assibey-Yeboah was born on March 2, 1974. He hails from Obo-Kwahu, a town in the Eastern Region of Ghana.

He is an old student of Presbyterian Boys' Secondary School, Legon, Accra (GCE Ordinary Level) and Ghana Secondary School, Koforidua (GCE Advanced Level). He holds a BSc (Hons) Agricultural Economics degree from Kwame Nkrumah University of Science and Technology (KNUST), Ghana and an MS (Agricultural and Resource Economics) from the University of Delaware, USA. He also holds an MA and a Ph.D. both in Economics from the University of Tennessee, USA specializing in International Macroeconomics, Monetary Economics and Econometrics.

Mark Assibey-Yeboah has been published in reputable journals such as Economic Record, International Journal for Finance and Economics, Journal for International Trade and Economic Development, and The North American Journal of Economics and Finance.

Employment 
Lecturer, University of Tennessee, USA
Adjunct Faculty, Milligan College, Tennessee, USA
Senior Economist, Bank of Ghana
Lecturer, Ghana Telecom (Technology) University College, Accra, Ghana
Lecturer, Ghana Institute of Management and Public Administration (GIMPA), Accra, Ghana
Member of Parliament, Ghana (January 7, 2013 - January 6, 2017; 1st term)
 Member of Parliament, Ghana (January 7, 2017– January 6, 2021; 2nd term), chairman, Finance Committee
 Consultant. 
Board member, ADB Bank Ghana, August 2018 - 2021
Member of American Economic Association

References

Ghanaian MPs 2017–2021
1974 births
Living people
New Patriotic Party politicians
Presbyterian Boys' Senior High School alumni